York Mills is a subway station on Line 1 Yonge–University in Toronto, Ontario, Canada. It is located at 4015 Yonge Street at the intersection of Wilson Avenue and York Mills Road in the neighbourhood of Hoggs Hollow.

History 

The station opened in 1973, in what was then the Borough of North York, and replaced  as the northern terminus of the Yonge line.

The original bus terminal was above ground, in a standard island configuration surrounded by bus bays, and at that time was also used by GO Transit buses, with transfers required for connecting TTC buses.

The current underground TTC bus platforms and GO Bus Terminal were built between 1985 and 1992 with the development of the York Mills Centre, with the TTC platforms inside the fare-paid area.

In 2007, this station became accessible with elevators.

By 2015, the tiles on the walls, floors and stairs had been replaced at this station. On the outer walls at track level the alternating light and dark green tiles were replaced by very light green metal panels with a dark green accent strip along the top. Moreover, in 2015 the station's 263 space commuter parking lot was sold to developers.

Entrances 

Northwest corner of Wilson and Yonge – street level entrance
Northeast corner of York Mills and Yonge – entrance via York Mills Centre
Old York Mills Road east of Yonge – Kiss and Ride, automatic entrance (accessible only by Presto card as of February 2018)

The construction of a mixed-use development at the northwest corner of Wilson Avenue and Yonge Street requires the demolition of the subway station entrance at that corner. , the TTC is planning a new accessible entrance to be built within the new development. The expected completion is in 2025.

Art 

A tapestry called "Breaking Ground" by artist Laurie Swim was installed in the station in 2010 to commemorate the 50th anniversary of an accident that took place in Hoggs Hollow. On March 17, 1960, the incident popularly known as the "Hoggs Hollow Disaster" occurred. Five young Italian immigrant workers were killed while constructing a tunnel for a water main. The details of the accident, where they were trapped 35 feet underground in a cramped, dimly lit tunnel, sparked a public outcry over the lack of safety standards in construction and ultimately led to an improvement in working conditions in Ontario.

Subway infrastructure in the vicinity 
The line passes under the Don River West Branch just south of the station platforms. The original plan was for an elevated station and a high-level bridge over the river, but local residents objected and the underground layout was substituted. Consequently, trains approach the station from both directions on a steep downgrade.

Nearby landmarks 
Nearby landmarks include York Mills Centre shopping mall, York Mills Park, Don Valley Golf Course, Loretto Abbey Catholic Secondary School, Canadian Forces College, Miller Tavern and Rosedale Golf Club

Surface connections 

TTC routes serving the station include:

References

External links 

Line 1 Yonge–University stations
Railway stations in Canada opened in 1973